{{Infobox darts player
| image = 
| name = Kirsty Hutchinson
| fullname = 
| nickname =
| birth_date = 
| birth_place = Durham, England
| death_date = 
| death_place = 
| hometown = Durham, England
| since = 2010
| darts = 22 Gram
| laterality = Right-handed
| music = Stupidisco by Junior Jack
| BDO = 2016–2020
| PDC = 2012–2015
| WDF = 2016–
| currentrank = 4 
| BDO World = Runner-up: 2022
| World Masters = Last 16:  2022
| World Darts Trophy = Last 16: 2019
| Dutch Open = Semi-Finals: 2022
| PDC World = 
| Matchplay = 
| Grand Prix = 
| UK Open = 
| European = 
| Premier League = 
| PC Finals = 
| results = {{aligned table|leftright=y|fullwidth=y|class=nowrap
|Northern Ireland Matchplay|2019
|Northern Ireland Open''|2019
| Welsh Open| 2021}}
}}Kirsty Hutchinson''' (born 6 April 1991) is an English professional darts player who plays in events of the World Darts Federation (WDF).

Career
In October 2019, Hutchinson qualified for the 2020 BDO World Darts Championship as one of the Playoff Qualifiers, but lost 1–2 to Aileen de Graaf in the first round. Hutchinson participated in the Women's World Championships where she defeated Jo Clements, Priscilla Steenbergen and Rhian O'Sullivan before losing to Beau Greaves in the final by 0–4 (s) while only managing to succeed one leg by checking out 2 within the final.

World Championship results

BDO
 2020: First round (lost to Aileen de Graaf 1–2)

WDF
 2022: Runner-up (lost to Beau Greaves 0–4)
 2023:

References

External links
 

Living people
English darts players
Professional Darts Corporation women's players
Professional Darts Corporation associate players
1991 births